An incomplete list of events which occurred in 1283 CE on the Italian peninsula.

Births
 Galvano Fiamma

Deaths
 Aldoino Filangieri di Candida
 Bonagratia de San Giovanni in Persiceto

Events
 Battle of Malta

References

Italy
Italy
Years of the 13th century in Italy